Ratomir "Rato" Tvrdić (born 14 September 1943) is a Croatian former professional basketball player.

Professional career
Tvrdić played club basketball with the Croatian team KK Split. With Split, he won two national Yugoslav League championships (1971, 1977), three national Yugoslav Cups (1972, 1974, 1977), and two FIBA Korać Cups (1976, 1977). He was also a runner-up of the FIBA European Champions Cup (EuroLeague) in the 1971–72 season, and in the FIBA Cup Winners' Cup (FIBA Saporta Cup) in the 1972–73 season.

He won the Small Triple Crown, in the 1976–77 season.

Yugoslav national team
Tvrdić played with the senior Yugoslav national team at the 1972 Summer Olympic Games. He was also the Yugoslav national team's captain. With Yugoslavia, he won several gold and silver medals, including at the FIBA World Cup and the FIBA EuroBasket.

He won silver medals at the 1967 FIBA World Championship and the 1974 FIBA World Championship, and a gold medal at the 1970 FIBA World Championship. He also won a silver medal at the 1969 EuroBasket, and gold medals at the 1973 EuroBasket and the 1975 EuroBasket. He also won a gold medal at the 1967 Mediterranean Games.

See also 
Lovre Tvrdić
Dražen Tvrdić
Damir Tvrdić

References

1943 births
Living people
Yugoslav men's basketball players
1970 FIBA World Championship players
1974 FIBA World Championship players
Croatian men's basketball players
KK Split players
Olympic basketball players of Yugoslavia
Basketball players at the 1972 Summer Olympics
Basketball players from Split, Croatia
Mediterranean Games gold medalists for Yugoslavia
Competitors at the 1967 Mediterranean Games
Shooting guards
FIBA World Championship-winning players
Mediterranean Games medalists in basketball
1967 FIBA World Championship players